Etz Chaim Yeshiva was a "Lithuanian"  Orthodox yeshiva, now advanced kollel, in Golders Green, London, England.  
It operated as a yeshiva from the early 1900s through the 1990s, when it repositioned to function as the latter.
It has several prominent alumni including Commonwealth Chief Rabbis Immanuel Jakobovits and  Jonathan Sacks.

History
The yeshiva was founded in about 1900 in London's East End, where it occupied a campus on Thrawl Street;
 
Rabbi Aharon Hyman was one of the founders.
Rabbi Joseph Green was the first Rosh Yeshiva, and Rabbi Moshe Yitzchak Segal,  later Rosh Yeshiva in Manchester, served as mashgiach ruchani.

During World War I, Rabbi Abraham Isaac Kook was associated with the Yeshiva during his stay in London.

Rabbi Nachman Shlomo Greenspan succeeded Rabbi Green as  rosh yeshiva from 1918 to 1961. During this period, Rabbi Elyah Lopian was mashgiach ruchani from 1926 - 1950.
Rabbi Leib Gurwicz, the latter's son in law and future Rosh Yeshiva at Gateshead, taught in the Yeshiva in the 1940s. Rabbi Hirsch Neumann taught in the yeshiva in the 1920s 

Rabbi Greenspan was succeeded by Rabbi Noson Ordman (1906-1996). 

 
Born in Tavrik, Lithuania, Rabbi Ordman was a 14 year alumnus of Telz Yeshiva; he came to London in 1936, and headed Etz Chaim for more than 50 years. 
From 1976 through the early 1980's Rabbi Aharon Pfeuffer led the Yeshiva alongside Rabbi Ordman.

In the 1960's the yeshiva had experienced a decline, with students drawn to Israeli and American yeshivas. Under Rabbi Pfeuffer, however, the Yeshiva saw a re-invigoration, attracting British talmidim studying at Israeli Yeshivas, particularly Mir and Hebron.

The yeshivah continued thereafter with several dozen students. In the 1990's it relocated to Bridge Ln, Golders Green; at the same time it was repositioned so as to function as a specialized bet midrash comprising several advanced kollels and chaburahs 
— focusing separately on Choshen Mishpat, Yoreh Deah, Seder Tohorot, and in depth Amud Yomi —
and was headed by Rabbi Zvi Rabi until he passed away in 2020.

Its regular minyan is associated with the Union of Orthodox Hebrew Congregations.

Notable alumni 
 Commonwealth Chief Rabbi Immanuel Jakobovits
 Commonwealth Chief Rabbi Jonathan Sacks
 Dayan  Pinchas Toledano, Chief Rabbi of the Netherlands and Amsterdam Av Beit Din
Rabbi Louis Isaac Rabinowitz, Chief Rabbi of South Africa
Rabbi Sinaj Adler, Chief Rabbi of Ashdod
Dayan Shemuel Bibas, Bet Din for Monetary Cases Jerusalem, and author of halachik works
Dayan Ivan Binstock, London Beth Din
 Rabbi Kopul Rosen, Principal Rabbi of the Federation of Synagogues
 Rabbi Stanley Abramovitch, American Jewish Joint Distribution Committee
 Rabbi Harry Freedman, translator of several volumes of the "Soncino Talmud" and "Soncino Midrash Rabbah".
Tzvi Yaron, Religious Zionist philosopher
 Dr Shlomo Adler, GP

See also
London School of Jewish Studies

References

Orthodox yeshivas in the United Kingdom
Haredi Judaism in the United Kingdom
Orthodox Judaism in London
Haredi yeshivas